δ-Tocopherol (delta-tocopherol) is a tocopherol and one of the chemical compounds that is considered vitamin E.  As a food additive, it has E number E309.

See also
 Alpha-Tocopherol
 Beta-Tocopherol
 Gamma-Tocopherol

References

Vitamin E
E-number additives